Rockin' in the Country is the sixth studio album by American country music singer Daryle Singletary. It was released June 9, 2009 via E1 Music. The album includes the non-charting single "Love You with the Lights On", as well as two cover versions: "How Can I Believe in You", previously recorded by Vern Gosdin on his 1984 album There Is a Season, and "Take Me Home, Country Roads", originally recorded by John Denver.

Track listing
"Rockin' in the Country" (Paul Overstreet, Sonny Tillis) – 3:47
duet with Charlie Daniels
"Love You with the Lights On" (Christopher Dubois, David Cory Lee) – 3:51
"That's Why God Made Me" (Harley Allen, Jimmy Melton) – 4:04
"How Can I Believe in You (When You'll Be Leaving Me)" (Buddy Cannon, Vern Gosdin) – 3:21
"Going Through Hell (With You Again)" (Don Poythress, Wynn Varble, Jimmy Wayne) – 3:17
"Background Noise" (Marc Beeson, Jim Collins, Curtis Wright) – 3:46
"If I Ever Get Her Back" (Billy Lawson, Billy Yates) – 3:01
"Real Estate Hands" (Lawson, Terry Skinner) – 4:23
"She's a Woman" (Lawson, Daryle Singletary) – 3:56
"She Sure Looks Good in Black" (Lawson, Dale Dodson) – 5:41
"They Know How to Grow 'em" (Lawson, Ed Hill) – 2:33
"Take Me Home, Country Roads" (John Denver, Bill Danoff, Taffy Nivert) – 3:07

References
[ Allmusic]

2009 albums
E1 Music albums
Daryle Singletary albums